Tobermory Airport  is located  southeast of Tobermory, Ontario, Canada. The airport operates from May to early October. No winter maintenance is offered.

Facilities

The airport has two small hangars to store aircraft (one per hangar), fuel station (Avgas or 100LL) and a building serving as the airport office.

A small parking lot is found at the entrance along Warner Bay Road. Occasionally helicopters land near the  parking lot; there is no formal helipad.

The airport supports itinerant users like ORNGE, and search and rescue teams including the Ontario Provincial Police.

Accidents

 June 13, 1971: A Cessna 182 crashed short of the airport, killing five, with one survivor.
 February 27, 2018: A Cessna 172 Skyhawk crashed in the snow with no injuries. The pilot was the only occupant, and the aircraft was badly damaged.
 July 3, 2018: A Piper Warrior flipped after an aborted takeoff. The aircraft sustained damages and the pilot and passengers suffered minor injuries.

Panorama

References

Registered aerodromes in Ontario